Yassin Bouih (born 24 November 1996) is an Italian middle-distance runner competing primarily in the 1500 metres. He represented Italy at the 2018 World Indoor Championships, finishing eleventh.

Biography
Of Moroccan and later acquired Italian citizenship, Yassin's parents came to Italy from Morocco to work, first to Turin before settling in Reggio Emilia where Yassin was born.

International competitions

Personal bests
Outdoor
 800 m — 1:50.88 (Milan 2014)
1500 metres – 3:37.34 (Carquefou, 2021)
3000 metres – 8:00.32 (Scandiano 2019)
5000 metres – 13:50.22 (Rovereto 2017)
10 kilometres – 29:45 (2017)

Indoor
1000 metres – 2:27.33 (Ancona 2015)
1500 metres – 3:42.78 (Vienna 2017)
3000 metres – 7:50.65 (Birmingham 2018)

National titles
 Italian Athletics Indoor Championships
 1500 metres: 2017, 2018, 2020
 3000 metres: 2017, 2018, 2020

See also
 Naturalized athletes of Italy

References

External links
 

1996 births
Living people
Italian male middle-distance runners
Italian people of Moroccan descent
Italian sportspeople of African descent
Sportspeople from Reggio Emilia
Athletics competitors of Fiamme Gialle